Nonu may refer to:

 Ma'a Nonu (born 1982), New Zealand rugby union player
 Nonu Lose Niumata, Samoan politician